Dhaka–Jessore line is a 172 km long under construction broad gauge railway. It is being constructed under the Ministry of Railways, Government of Bangladesh. The line will connect the capital of Bangladesh to Jessore via Dhaka District, Narayanganj District, Munshiganj District, Shariatpur District, Madaripur District, Faridpur District, Gopalganj District, Bangladesh, and Narail District. It is a project related to Padma Bridge.

Project
The railway connection project of Padma Bridge brings the greater regions of Faridpur and northern Jessore of Bangladesh under the railway network. The first phase includes the construction of a 172 km long broad gauge line starts from Dhaka to Jessore. According to the schedule of the authority, the Padma Bridge Rail link project will be completed in 2024. In this project Bangladeshi government is financing , the remaining  will be financed by China.

Route
According to the sources of the project authority, the proposed line starts from Gendaria in Dhaka. It pass through the districts of Narayanganj, Munshiganj, Madaripur, Shariatpur, Faridpur and Gopalganj of Dhaka Division, Narail and end at Jessore of Khulna Division. The route is divided by four sections for the construction process, The first section includes double line of dual gauge railway from Kamalapur to Gandaria. The second section, includes four railway stations, is a 36 km long single broad gauge line from Gandaria to Mawa. The next section, another single broad gauge line, is 42 km long that starts from Mawa and ends to Bhanga Junction. The section has five railway stations. The last section of the project is a 86 km broad gauge single line. From Bhanga to Rupdia, there will be ten railway stations. The Dhaka–Jessore line is a 172 km railway including 22 km viaduct line and the project authority is building 14 railway stations excluding six realigned railway stations.

Planning
The plan of the railway project consists of the construction of a line 11 meter above the ground, a 43 km long loop, bridges and culverts, 30 level crossings and 40 underpasses etc. The project was scheduled to run from 1 January 2016 to 30 June 2024.

Construction
In 2018, the railway construction of this line, covering 40 km on both sides of the river bridge on Padma, began. However, due to the lack of permission, it was not possible to install the railway on the bridge. On 17 July 2022, permission was given to lay railway tracks on the Padma Bridge. As of May 2022, 60% of the construction of 81 km of the line is complete. In June 2023, the construction of the first three sections of the Dhaka–Jessore line will be completed and opened.

Stations
Railway stations on the Dhaka–Jessore line are mentioned below:

Phase 1 (44 km)
 Kamalapur railway station (part of Narayanganj–Bahadurabad Ghat line)
 Gandaria railway station (start of the line)
 Keraniganj railway station
 Nimtala railway station
 Sreenagar railway station
 Mawa railway station

Phase 2 (42 km)
 Zajira railway station
 Shibchar railway station
 Bhanga Junction railway station (connects Pachuria–Bhanga and Bhanga–Kuakata line)

Phase 3 (86 km)
 Nagarkanda railway station
 Muksudpur railway station
 Maheshpur railway station
 Kashiani Junction railway station (connects Kalukhali–Gobra and Bhatiapara Ghat)
 Lohagara railway station
 Narail railway station
 Jamdia railway station
 Padmabila Junction railway station
 Rupdia railway station (towards Jessore Junction)
 Singia railway station (to Darshana–Khulna line)

References

Padma Bridge
Dual gauge railways in Bangladesh
Proposed railway lines in Asia